The twelfth season of The Real Housewives of Orange County, an American reality television series, is broadcast on Bravo. It aired from July 10, 2017, until November 27, 2017 and is primarily filmed in Orange County, California. Its executive producers are Adam Karpel, Alex Baskin, Douglas Ross, Gregory Stewart, Scott Dunlop, Stephanie Boyriven and Andy Cohen.

The twelfth season of The Real Housewives of Orange County focuses on the lives of Vicki Gunvalson, Tamra Judge, Lydia McLaughlin, Shannon Beador, Meghan King Edmonds, Kelly Dodd and Peggy Sulahian.

Production and crew
In April 2017, the series was officially renewed for its twelfth season. Adam Karpel, Alex Baskin, Douglas Ross, Gregory Stewart, Scott Dunlop, Stephanie Boyriven and Andy Cohen are recognized as the series' executive producers; it is produced and distributed by Evolution Media.

Cast and synopsis
In January 2017, Heather Dubrow announced her departure from the series, after five seasons. In May 2017, it was announced former housewife Lydia McLaughlin would return. In June 2017, it was announced Gunvalson, Judge, Beador, King Edmonds and Dodd would return, alongside new housewife Peggy Sulahian. Former housewives Gretchen Rossi, Lizzie Rovsek and Jeana Keough will make guest appearances.

Episodes

References

External links

 
 
 

2017 American television seasons
Orange County (season 12)